The European Club Cup of Champions, often known as the European Cup or ECCC, was a table tennis competition for European club teams. It was organized by the European Table Tennis Union (ETTU) annually for men's and women's teams. It was first held in session 1960/61 for the men's competition, and the women's competition three years later. However, the competition was replaced by the present European Champions League for the men's and women's competition in session 2001/02 and 2005/06 respectively.

Format
The competition was contested by the current national champion team of ETTU member associations of each season. In the 1960/61 season, the first competition for men was held and three years later there was also the women's competition. Since 1994/95, the "best of three" format was replaced, rather the new format that if a team won both the home and away match then it won the game. If each team won for a match, then a decision game would be played.

In the session 1998/99, a new competition of different format, named "European Champions League", was held for the men's competition. The success of the Champions League called for the discontinuation of the Men's European Cup in 2001/02, after three years' co-existence, and ultimately replaced the women's competition as well in session 2005/06.

Results
In the early years, the competitions were mostly dominated by the Eastern European teams, in the men's competition until the late 1970s, and in the ladies - especially by the Hungarian club Statisztika Budapest - by the end of the 1980s. This led to the promotion of table tennis in the Eastern Europe, where players had the best training facilities and good coaches available. Later on, Western European teams won more frequently, especially the German teams. This shift is owing to the growing professionalization in the sports and the sponsorship obtained in those countries, thus attracting some top foreign players playing for the Western European clubs.

List of Winners of the Men's Competition

 1961 -  CSM Cluj
 1962 -  GSTK Zagreb
 1963 -  Vasetupitö Törekves
 1964 -  CSM Cluj
 1965 -  CSM Cluj
 1966 -  CSM Cluj
 1967 -  CSM Cluj
 1968 -  Slavia Prague
 1969 -  Slavia Prague
 1970 -  Spartacus Budapest
 1971 -  Spartacus Budapest
 1972 -  Ormesby TTC
 1973 -  GSTK Zagreb
 1974 -  GSTK Zagreb
 1975 -  Sparta Prague
 1976 -  GSTK Zagreb
 1977 -  Sparta Prague
 1978 -  Sparta Prague
 1979 -  Spartacus Budapest
 1980 -  Spartacus Budapest
 1981 -  Spartacus Budapest
 1982 -  Heinzelmann Reutlingen
 1983 -  Heinzelmann Reutlingen
 1984 -  Simex Jülich
 1985 -  AZS Gdansk
 1986 -  ATSV Saarbrücken
 1987 -  Zugbrücke Grenzau
 1988 -  Zugbrücke Grenzau
 1989 -  Borussia Düsseldorf
 1990 -  UTT Levallois
 1991 -  Borussia Düsseldorf
 1992 -  Borussia Düsseldorf
 1993 -  Borussia Düsseldorf
 1994 -  Sporting Villette Charleroi
 1995 -  UTRussia Roslian T Levallois
 1996 -  Sporting Villette Charleroi
 1997 -  Borussia Düsseldorf
 1998 -  Borussia Düsseldorf
 1999 -  TTV Hornstein
 2000 -  Zugbrücke Grenzau
 2001 -  Večernji Zagreb

List of Winners of the Women's Competition

 1964 -  Vointa Arad
 1965 -  Vointa Arad
 1966 -  DTC Kaiserberg
 1967 -  Progresul Bucharest
 1968 -  BSG Aussenhandel
 1969 -  BSG Aussenhandel
 1970 -  Statisztika Budapest
 1971 -  Statisztika Budapest
 1972 -  Statisztika Budapest
 1973 -  Statisztika Budapest
 1974 -  Statisztika Budapest
 1975 -  Sparte Prague
 1976 -  Statisztika Budapest
 1977 -  Statisztika Budapest
 1978 -  Statisztika Budapest
 1979 -  Statisztika Budapest
 1980 -  Statisztika Budapest
 1981 -  Statisztika Budapest
 1982 -  Statisztika Budapest
 1983 -  Statisztika Budapest
 1984 -  Statisztika Budapest
 1985 -  Statisztika Budapest
 1986 -  Statisztika Budapest
 1987 -  Avanti Hazersvoude
 1988 -  Spartak Vlasim
 1989 -  Statisztika Budapest
 1990 -  Statisztika Budapest
 1991 -  Statisztika Budapest
 1992 -  SPVG Steinhagen
 1993 -  SPVG Steinhagen
 1994 -  Statisztika Budapest
 1995 -  Statisztika Budapest
 1996 -  Statisztika Budapest
 1997 -  FC Langweid
 1998 -  Team Galaxis Lübeck
 1999 -  Statisztika Budapest
 2000 -  Statisztika Budapest
 2001 -  Statisztika Budapest
 2002 -  Henk ten Hoor DTK
 2003 -  FSV Kropach
 2004 -  Müllermilch Langweid
 2005 -  Müllermilch Langweid

References

Table tennis competitions
European international sports competitions